Holocystis is a genus of prehistoric stony corals.

References

External links
 

Scleractinia genera
Prehistoric Hexacorallia genera
Cyathophoridae